The Logistic Regiment is the military logistics regiment of the Royal Danish Army, responsible for army supply and emergency medical personnel. It is based in Aalborg.

History

Regimental origins can be traced back to 1865 when the first logistic companies were established in the Royal Artillery. It was not until 1880 that there was established a separate exercise department, which still was subject to artillery.

In 2015, the Danish Military Police was amalgamated with the Logistic Regiment.

Structure
Today the Regiment has four logistics battalions, plus a corps of Military police of full battalion strength:
  Staff
  1st Logistical Battalion
  Staff Platoon
  1st Supply Company
  2nd Medical Company
  3rd Maintenance Company
  4th Transport Company
  2nd Logistical Battalion
  1st Basic Training Company
  2nd Basic Training Company
  3rd Logistic Training Company
  3rd Maintenance Battalion (inactive)
  Staff 
  1st Company 
  2nd Company
  4th National Support Battalion (Vordingborg Barraks)
  1st National Support Element
  2nd National Support Element
  3rd National Support Element
   4th National Support Element
  5th National Support Element (Basic Training)
  Military police
  1st MP Company
  2nd MP Company
  MP Company/ 1st Brigade
  MP School
  MP Station Copenhagen
  MP Station Ålborg

References

Danish Army regiments